Bogaraš (Hungarian: Bogaras vagy Félváros) is a village in Serbia. It is situated in the Bačka Topola municipality, in the North Bačka District, Vojvodina province. The village has a Hungarian ethnic majority and its population was 94 as of the 2002 census.

See also
List of places in Serbia
List of cities, towns and villages in Vojvodina

Places in Bačka